The Purdue Homeland Security Institute (PHSI) at Purdue University was created in 2002 in response to the September 11 attacks, with the mission to help the United States prevent, protect, respond and recover from any threat or action taken against it. The PHSI has initiated partnerships with other universities, local and state agencies, and businesses. Dennis Engi, professor and head of industrial engineering, directed the PHSI in its formative stages. The current director, J. Eric Dietz, is responsible for the Institute developing responses to threats in Indiana, nationally and internationally.

Sources and notes

External links
Official website

Purdue University
West Lafayette, Indiana
United States national security policy